Ben Bridge Jeweler is a high-end American jewelry retailer that sells engagement rings, diamonds and watches, including Rolex, among other luxury product and is currently owned by Warren Buffett's Berkshire Hathaway. It was established in Seattle, Washington, in 1912 and currently operates over 80 stores in the United States.

History 
In 1912, a watchmaker named Samuel Silverman opened his first store in downtown Seattle. Silverman's son-in-law Ben Bridge joined the firm as a partner in 1922; Ben later purchased Sam's firm and renamed it Ben Bridge Jeweler. Since then, the company has expanded to over 70 retail stores in 11 different states, primarily in the western United States. In May 2000, Ben Bridge Jeweler was acquired by Berkshire Hathaway. Today, the company continues to be family-operated and is currently managed by Ben's great-granddaughter Lisa Bridge.

References

Sources

External links 
 

Berkshire Hathaway
American companies established in 1912
Retail companies established in 1912
Jewelry retailers of the United States
Companies based in Seattle
1912 establishments in Washington (state)
2000 mergers and acquisitions